Paul Clayton is a fictional character from the British ITV soap opera Coronation Street. Portrayed by Lee Booth, the character first appeared on-screen during an episode that aired on 29 November 2000. When the character returned in 2007, Paul was played by Tom Hudson.

Storylines
The son of Terry Duckworth and Andrea Clayton, Paul was born off-screen on 16 February 1986, following the Clayton family's departure. Paul was raised by his maternal grandmother whilst Andrea went to university. Paul's paternal grandmother, Vera, however, insisted on some involvement in her grandson's upbringing, so the family decided to leave.

In November 2000, Andrea returned to Weatherfield looking for Terry as Paul needed a kidney transplant. Terry initially agreed to be a donor but fled and Vera was forced to donate her kidney instead, saving Paul's life. Paul returned in November 2001 for his paternal grandfather Jack's 65th birthday celebrations.

He wasn't seen again until 2007 when Molly Compton contacted him, concerning Vera's poor health. He moved into 9 Coronation Street in order to help Jack look after Vera. It was soon revealed that Paul had come to Weatherfield after being caught in bed with his ex-employer's wife. Upon his return, Paul began working at Leanne Battersby's restaurant, Valandro's, and eventually bought a share by taking out a loan in Jack's name. Following Paul's arrival at number 9, Tyrone Dobbs began to get suspicious of him. Tyrone repeatedly tried to catch Paul taking Jack's money but was unsuccessful. However, in September, Tyrone blamed Paul after Jack and Vera realized money was missing after Paul took some to buy items for the restaurant without Jack's permission. Jack suspected Tyrone was responsible after catching him checking his tin.

In October 2007, Paul's previous employer persuaded Leanne to reveal Paul's whereabouts. Even though she told him to take his case to number 9, Tyrone allowed Paul to escape out the back of the house. The employer subsequently raided Valandro's. Following this, Paul revealed to Leanne that he had feelings for her. Around Christmas, Paul told Jack about the loan he had taken out, meaning that he and Vera did not have as much money as they thought for a house in Blackpool, where they had planned to retire to. Not wanting to upset Vera, Jack told her that he'd miscalculated their savings.

Following Vera's death in 2008, Dan Mason told Jack that he had a winning betting slip worth £3000 but needed the slip before he could pay him. Tyrone had placed the bet for Jack and gave the slip to Vera to pass on to Jack, though forgot prior to her death. Paul found the betting slip after he, Jack, Tyrone and Molly searched for it for almost two weeks. Dan confronted him when he attempted to hand it in himself. They agreed that Dan would get a share of the money if he cashed the slip and he gave Paul £2000. Unfortunately,  Harry mentioned the slip to Jack but soon realized that he knew nothing about it. Harry explained that he was mistaken and confronted his son, insisting that Dan pay Jack the £3000 himself. Dan subsequently demanded Paul pay him back but Paul refused, leading Dan to order meals at Valandro's and refuse to pay. Consequently, Paul began avoiding Dan until Dan kidnapped him. Paul claimed that he had nothing except the clothes on his back so Dan demanded Paul give him his clothes and Jack offered to pay Dan.

In March 2008, Paul set fire to Valandro's for Leanne, hoping it would lead to a more romantic relationship. Having discovered that Leanne had used him, he gave a statement to the police about his and Leanne's plan. Dan, now dating Leanne, gave her an alibi and left Paul to face two years in prison. When Jack learned that Paul was considering going on the run, Jack offered him £10,000 to stay and promised him £30,000 on his release so Paul would be able to start a new life but he left the country. However, Paul left the money behind, making Jack proud.

Reception
Following his return in 2007, viewers weren't sure whether the character had good or bad intentions, whilst the character was involved in the storyline which seen Paul invest in Jack's savings.

Development
When the character's return was announced in 2007, it was revealed that the character would pick up where his on-screen father Terry left off. Tom Hudson stated that the character would develop to become a "loveable rogue", but would become much more of a rogue than lovable. He also said that the character would take interest in various of the Street's ladies. Following the character's return, Tom revealed that a role on the show was what he'd always hoped for, having watched the show with his mother as a child. Around the time that Liz Dawn, who played the character of Paul's paternal grandmother, Vera Duckworth, was revealed to be leaving the show, Tom claimed that he would miss the actor, even though he understood that her ill health forced her to leave. Prior to the character's departure in 2008, Tom claimed that he had enjoyed his role on the show, but had other things planned. Tom also said that the character would definitely return in later years, resembling his on-screen father; he also stated that the storyline in which the character would exit was what Tom had hoped for.

See also
List of Coronation Street characters (2000)

References

Coronation Street characters
Fictional chefs
Male characters in television
Television characters introduced in 2000